Unlearn may refer to:
Unlearn, an album and its title track by the band Psykosonik
Unlearn, an album by Youngblood Brass Band
"Unlearn", a song by Reks from his album REBELutionary